Ernest Turner may refer to:

 E. S. Turner (Ernest Sackville Turner, 1909–2006), freelance journalist and author
 Ernest Turner (footballer) (1898–1951), Welsh footballer
 Ernest Turner (politician) (1876–1943), Australian politician